Lunga Lunga is a settlement and Sub-County in Kenya's Kwale County. It is situated just six kilometers from Kenya's border with Tanzania.

Location
Lunga Lunga is located in extreme southeastern Kenya, at the international border with Tanzania.

International border
The town lies at the International border between Tanzania to the south and Kenya to the north. In keeping with East African Community recommendations and guidelines, the Lunga Lunga border crossing is one of those selected to convert to a one-stop crossing. Infrastructure is being modified so that both humans and cargo can be jointly cleared by both Kenyan and Tanzanian authorities at one physical location, in real time.

See also
 Ukunda
 Diani Beach
 Msambweni

References

External links
  Kenya`s EAC Border Posts To Be Complete In June

Populated places in Coast Province
Kwale County
Kenya–Tanzania border crossings